The Madras Diabetes Research Foundation (MDRF) is a medical research organization located in Gopalapuram, Chennai. MDRF was established in 1996 by an eminent diabetologist, Dr. V. Mohan.

Research activities
MDRF conducts basic, clinical and epidemiological research in diabetes and allied fields. The organization has collaborated with several international and national centres and have published significant number of research and case-studies articles in peer reviewed journals. It is recognized as the ‘Centre for Advanced Research in Genomics of Diabetes’ by the Indian Council of Medical Research (ICMR).

Academic activities
The MDRF is recognized by the Tamil Nadu Dr. MGR Medical University and the University of Madras for conducting courses leading to the award of PhD degree. The organization has also been offering a 'Postgraduate Course in Diabetology' in association with American Diabetes Association (ADA) to train medical professionals in diabetes care and management.

References

External links
 Official Website

Research institutes in Chennai
Medical research institutes in India
Indian Council of Medical Research
Colleges affiliated to University of Madras
Research institutes established in 1996
1996 establishments in Tamil Nadu